The 2007–08 North West Counties Football League season was the 26th in the history of the North West Counties Football League in England. Teams were divided into two divisions: Division One and Division Two.

Division One 

Division One featured two new teams:

 Runcorn Linnets promoted as runners up of Division Two
 Winsford United promoted as champions of Division Two

League table

Division Two 

Division Two featured two new teams:

 Stone Dominoes relegated from Division One
 Kirkham & Wesham promoted as champions of the West Lancashire League

League table

References

 https://web.archive.org/web/20120226133714/https://web.archive.org/web/20120226133714/http://www.nwcfl.com/archives/previous-league-tables/2007-08.htm

External links 
 NWCFL Official Site

North West Counties Football League seasons
9